Turrella railway station is located on the East Hills line, serving the Sydney suburb of Turrella. It is served by Sydney Trains T8 Airport & South line services.

History
Turrella station opened on 21 September 1931 when the East Hills line opened from Tempe to East Hills. In 2000, as part of the quadruplication of the line between Wolli Creek and Kingsgrove, through lines were added on either side of the existing pair.

Platforms & services

Transport links
Transit Systems operates one route via Turrella station:
473: Campsie to Rockdale station via Clemton Park, Earlwood, Bardwell Park and Arncliffe

Trackplan

References

External links

Turrella station details Transport for New South Wales

Railway stations in Sydney
Railway stations in Australia opened in 1931
East Hills railway line